Ramona is a 1928 American silent drama film directed by Edwin Carewe, based on Helen Hunt Jackson's 1884 novel Ramona, and starring Dolores del Río and Warner Baxter. This was the first United Artists film with a synchronized score and sound effect, but no dialogue, and so was not a talking picture. The novel had been previously filmed by D. W. Griffith in 1910 with Mary Pickford, remade in 1916 with Adda Gleason, and again in 1936 with Loretta Young.

Plot
The film depicts Ramona, who is half Native American, as she is raised by a Mexican family. Ramona suffers racism and prejudice in her community, and when she finds out that she is half Native, she chooses to identify as a Native American instead of a Mexican American so that she can marry Alessandro, who is a Native as well. This romantic tragedy relays the tragic death of Ramona and Alessandro’s child at the hands of a Caucasian doctor, who refuses to help their child because of his skin color. Shortly after, the couple moves away, and Alessandro is killed by a white man for robbing him of his horse; Ramona eventually reunites with her childhood friend Felipe and starts a new life as a depressed woman. She is able to recover from her depression and remember her feelings for Felipe only when he sings a song from their childhood to restore her memory.

Cast
 Dolores del Río as Ramona
 Warner Baxter as Alessandro
 Roland Drew as Felipe
 Vera Lewis as Señora Moreno
 Michael Visaroff as Juan Canito
 John T. Prince as Father Salvierderra
 Mathilde Comont as Marda
 Carlos Amor as Sheepherder
 Jess Cavin as Bandit Leader
 Rita Carewe as Baby
 Jean the Dog as Dog
 Shep Houghton as the Mexican Boy
 Nadine Riga as the Girl
 Saint-Granier as the French singer
 Dorothy Teters as the Indian

Production

Parts of the film were shot in Zion National Park, Springdale, and Cedar Breaks National Monument, all in Utah.

Reception
Mordaunt Hall of The New York Times found much to praise in what he called "an Indian love lyric": "This current offering is an extraordinarily beautiful production, intelligently directed and, with the exception of a few instances, splendidly acted. The scenic effects are charming. ... The different episodes are told discreetly and with a good measure of suspense and sympathy. Some of the characters have been changed to enhance the dramatic worth of the picture, but this is pardonable, especially when one considers this subject as a whole."

Effects
An article published by UCLA claimed that the 1928 film is believed to be the most authentic of the five film adaptations of Ramona since the director Edwin Carewe was part Chickasaw and Dolores del Río was raised in Mexico. Ramona is differentiated from most films with a typical Hollywood ending because of its authentic cultural values embedded throughout. An article by Indian Country Today revealed the fact that Carewe discovered del Río in Mexico and invited her to Hollywood to perform in his film. Many film enthusiasts see Carewe as del Río’s steppingstone to fame in Hollywood as an actor and singer. Del Río recorded the film's theme song, "Ramona." It was not used in the 1936 version.

Helen Hunt Jackson and Edwin Carewe shared a goal of exposing the mistreatment of the Native Americans at the hands of the U.S. Federal Government through the means of Ramona. Both the book and the film, however, were popularized because of their dramatic, romantic, and cultural aspects.

Preservation status
For decades, Ramona was thought to be lost until archivists rediscovered it in the Národní Filmový Archiv in Prague in 2010. The Motion Picture, Broadcasting and Recorded Sound Division of the Library of Congress later transferred Ramona’s highly flammable original nitrate film to acetate safety stock. Library of Congress Moving Image Curator Rob Stone was in charge of the challenge of converting Ramona’s Czech intertitles back into English. The only available copy was given to the Library of Congress to replicate and then send back to the Czech Republic.

The restored version of the 1928 film had its world premiere in the Billy Wilder Theater with the Mont Alto Motion Picture Orchestra playing live at the University of California, Los Angeles on March 29, 2014.  Carewe's older brother Finis Fox had written Ramona's screenplay and created its intertitles.

See also
 List of rediscovered films

References

External links

 
 
 
 

1928 films
1928 drama films
1920s rediscovered films
Silent American drama films
American silent feature films
American black-and-white films
Films directed by Edwin Carewe
Films set in California
Films shot in Utah
Films based on Ramona by Helen Hunt Jackson
Rediscovered American films
United Artists films
1920s American films